Linnei Township is a rural township in Yunlin County, Taiwan. It is the second smallest township in Yunlin County after Baozhong Township.

History
During the Japanese era,  covered modern-day Douliu and Linnei and was under Toroku District of Tainan Prefecture.

Geography
It has a population total of 16,856 and an area of 37.6035 km2.

Administrative divisions
Linnan, Linzhong, Linbei, Pingding, Linmao, Jiuqiong, Huben, Wutu, Wuma and Zhongxing Village.

Tourist attractions
 Baima Temple
 Farming and Irrigation Artifacts Museum
 Linnei Park
 Mount Xiao Huang
 Pingding Ruins
 Tian Shen Temple
 Wutu Power Plant

Transportation

The township is accessible by Linnei Station of Taiwan Railways.

References

External links

 Linnei Township Office, Yunlin County

Townships in Yunlin County